Jata Chhapar is a census town in Chhindwara district in the Indian state of Madhya Pradesh.

Demographics
 India census, Jata Chhapar had a population of 3455. Males constitute 52% of the population and females 48%. Jata Chhapar has an average literacy rate of 69%, higher than the national average of 59.5%: male literacy is 77%, and female literacy is 62%. In Jata Chhapar, 12% of the population is under 6 years of age.

References

Cities and towns in Chhindwara district